In Our Image: America's Empire in the Philippines is a 1989 book by American journalist Stanley Karnow, published by Random House. The book details the Philippine–American War (1899–1902) and the subsequent American occupation of the islands. Karnow described the book as "the story of America's only major colonial experience. How did we perform? What did we do there? What have we left there?" Karnow made six trips to the Philippines for research while writing the book, and also drew heavily on archives.

The book was awarded the 1990 Pulitzer Prize for History.

References

External links
Booknotes interview with Karnow on In Our Image, May 28, 1989.

1989 non-fiction books
20th-century history books
English-language books
Pulitzer Prize for History-winning works
History books about the United States
History of the Philippines (1898–1946)
Random House books
Philippines–United States relations